Rice Lake is an irregularly shaped body of water located  southwest of Minot in Ward County, North Dakota.

Rice Lake Park occupies the eastern shore of the lake.

References

Lakes of North Dakota
Bodies of water of Ward County, North Dakota